Elena Wassen (born 1 November 2000) is a German competitive diver.

She competed at the 2015 World Aquatics Championships.

At the 2016 Summer Olympics, she competed in the women's 10 metre platform event. She finished 17th in the semifinal and did not advance to the final.
She was the youngest member of the German Olympic team.

See also
Germany at the 2015 World Aquatics Championships

References

External links 
 
 
 

German female divers
Living people
Place of birth missing (living people)
2000 births
Divers at the 2015 European Games
European Games bronze medalists for Germany
European Games medalists in diving
Divers at the 2016 Summer Olympics
Olympic divers of Germany
Divers at the 2018 Summer Youth Olympics
Divers at the 2020 Summer Olympics
People from Eschweiler
Sportspeople from Cologne (region)
21st-century German women